Michael Gary Joseph Fiore  (born October 11, 1944) is a former first baseman in Major League Baseball. Mike was born in Brooklyn, New York and attended Lafayette High School. He was signed by the New York Mets before the  season, drafted by the Baltimore Orioles from the Mets in the 1963 first-year draft (December 2), and later drafted by the Kansas City Royals from the Orioles as the 17th pick in the 1968 expansion draft.  He played for the Orioles (1968), Royals (1969–1970), Boston Red Sox (1970–1971), St. Louis Cardinals (1972), and San Diego Padres(1972).

Fiore hit the first home run in Kansas City Royals history.  It took place at the Oakland–Alameda County Coliseum in their fifth game April 13, .  Fiore led off the top of the 2nd with a solo shot against Oakland Athletics All-Star John "Blue Moon" Odom.

His personal high for playing time was during the 1969 season, when he hit .274 with 12 HR and 35 RBI in 107 games.  He finished his career with a lifetime batting average of .227, 13 HR, 50 RBI, and 75 runs scored in 254 ballgames.

External links

Retrosheet

1944 births
Living people
Baltimore Orioles players
Kansas City Royals players
Boston Red Sox players
St. Louis Cardinals players
San Diego Padres players
Quincy Jets players
Richmond Braves players
Rochester Red Wings players
Elmira Pioneers players
Aberdeen Pheasants players
Tri-City Atoms players
Columbus Clippers players
Syracuse Chiefs players
Tulsa Oilers (baseball) players
Baseball players from New York (state)
Major League Baseball first basemen
Lafayette High School (New York City) alumni